The 2014 Atlantic 10 Men's Soccer Tournament, known as the 2014 Atlantic 10 Men's Soccer Tournament Presented by Amtrak for sponsorship reasons, was the eighteenth edition of the tournament. Held from Nov. 13-16, it determined the Atlantic 10 Conference's automatic berth into the 2014 NCAA Division I Men's Soccer Championship.

The tournament was hosted by Virginia Commonwealth University and all matches were contested at Sports Backers Stadium.

Qualification 

The top eight teams in the Atlantic 10 Conference based on their conference regular season records qualified for the tournament.

Bracket

Schedule

Quarterfinals

Semifinals

A-10 Championship

Statistical leaders

See also 
 Atlantic 10 Conference
 2014 Atlantic 10 Conference men's soccer season
 2014 NCAA Division I men's soccer season
 2014 NCAA Division I Men's Soccer Championship

Atlantic 10 Men's Soccer Tournament
Atlantic 10 Men's Soccer
Atlantic 10 Men's Soccer Tournament